The Pond Creek Station, located east of Wallace on US 40, in Wallace County, Kansas, is a two-story frame building that was a stagecoach station built 1865.  It is believed to be the oldest manmade structure in northwest Kansas and to be the only Butterfield Overland Dispatch stage company building surviving in Kansas.  It was listed on the National Register of Historic Places in 1972.

The station building has been moved more than once, including in 1871 and in 1898; it is now located just half a mile from its original location.  It includes bullet holes from Indian attacks.  At the time of its NRHP listing, it was used as a museum building by the Fort Wallace Memorial Association.

References

External links

Kansas Historical Association: Wallace County, includes photo of Pond Creek Station

Commercial buildings on the National Register of Historic Places in Kansas
Buildings and structures completed in 1865
Buildings and structures in Wallace County, Kansas
Transportation buildings and structures on the National Register of Historic Places in Kansas
1865 establishments in Kansas
National Register of Historic Places in Wallace County, Kansas
Stagecoach stations on the National Register of Historic Places